War Dances is a 2009 collection of short stories and poems by Sherman Alexie. It received the 2010 PEN/Faulkner Award for Fiction.

American short story collections
Short story collections by Sherman Alexie
2009 short story collections
PEN/Faulkner Award for Fiction-winning works
Grove Press books